Workers World is the official newspaper of the Workers' World Party (WWP), a communist party in the United States. Sam Marcy led a faction out of the Socialist Workers Party and founded WWP in 1959; the first issue of Workers World was published in New York City in March of that year.

Content
Workers World featured the writings of Sam Marcy and Workers World Party co-founder Vincent Copeland (the first editor as well) — among many others — until Copeland's passing in 1993 and, subsequently, Marcy's death in 1998. The ideological positions of WWP were developed largely through articles in the newspaper, but it has never been strictly devoted to that line. Workers' struggles, racism and discrimination were, and continue to be, extensively covered in the paper.

Publication information
Workers World has always operated by an all-volunteer staff. While distributed nationally from the beginning, it was a monthly paper until 1974, when it expanded into a weekly. It is published every week except for the first week of the New Year, and currently costs $1. Subscriptions are distributed worldwide, to homes, organizations and prisons; for many years the last page has printed pertinent articles in Spanish as Mundo Obrero. Workers World also publishes nearly all of its articles on the website workers.org, becoming one of the first communist newspapers to take advantage of the internet to reach more people.

References

External links
Workers World official website.
Communist periodicals published in the United States
Newspapers established in 1959
Workers World Party
1959 establishments in the United States